Leslie Donovan Perera Handunge (born 18 June 1921, date of death unknown) was a Sri Lankan boxer. He competed at the 1948 Summer Olympics and the 1952 Summer Olympics.

References

External links
 

1921 births
Year of death missing
Sri Lankan male boxers
Olympic boxers of Sri Lanka
Boxers at the 1948 Summer Olympics
Boxers at the 1952 Summer Olympics
Place of birth missing
Flyweight boxers